Kerry Simpson (born 6 November 1981) is a Canadian speed skater. She competed in the women's 500 metres at the 2006 Winter Olympics, placing 21st.

References

External links
 

1981 births
Living people
Canadian female speed skaters
Olympic speed skaters of Canada
Speed skaters at the 2006 Winter Olympics
Sportspeople from Melville, Saskatchewan